Robert Walser is an American musicologist associated with the "new musicology". He is author of the book Running With the Devil: Power, Gender, and Madness in Heavy Metal Music, concerning heavy metal music. Walser currently is a member of the faculty at Case Western Reserve University.

Walser has also served as an expert witness for over 250 music copyright infringement cases, generally reserved to the Ninth Circuit. His big success came from a broad statement of support from Circuit Judge William C. Canby, Jr., who fully supported Dr. Walser's methodology, despite the less-than-appropriate credibility that Dr. Walser received via District Judge Christina A. Snyder {see Swirsky v. Carey, 226 F. Supp. 2d 1224 (C.D. Cal. 2002).

Walser is married to musicologist Susan McClary.

Publications

 Running With the Devil: Power, Gender, and Madness in Heavy Metal Music (Wesleyan University Press, 1993). Second edition, revised and expanded, 2014.
 (ed.) Keeping Time. Readings in Jazz History (OUP, 1999) 2.  Second edition, revised and expanded, 2014.
 (ed.)  The Christopher Small Reader  (Wesleyan University Press, 2016).
 Valuing Jazz, in The Cambridge Companion to Jazz, ed. David Horn and Mervyn Cooke (Cambridge:  Cambridge University Press, 2002), pp. 301–320. 
 Analyzing Popular Music:  Ten Apothegms and Four Instances, in Allan Moore, ed., The Analysis of Popular Music (Cambridge:  Cambridge University Press, 2003), pp. 16–38.  
 Deep Jazz:  Notes on Interiority, Race, and Criticism, in Inventing the Psychological:  Toward a Cultural History of Emotional Life in America, ed. Joel Pfister and Nancy Schnog (Yale University Press, 1997), pp. 271–96.  
 Out of Notes:  Signification, Interpretation, and the Problem of Miles Davis, Musical Quarterly 77:2 (Summer 1993), pp. 343–65.
 Rhythm, Rhyme, and Rhetoric in the Music of Public Enemy, Ethnomusicology 39:2 (Spring-Summer 1995), 193-217.  
  Prince as Queer Poststructuralist, Popular Music and Society 18:2 (Summer 1994), 87-98.

References

External links
 Walser's Bio, from the CWRU Department of Music
 Robert Walser: "Review Essay:  Polka Happiness, by Charles Keil, Angeliki Keil, and Dick Blau, and A Passion for Polka:  Old-Time Ethnic Music in America, by Victor Greene," American Music 12:3 (Fall 1994), pp. 322–27.

Case Western Reserve University faculty
Year of birth missing (living people)
Living people
Place of birth missing (living people)
20th-century American musicologists
20th-century American male writers
20th-century American non-fiction writers
21st-century American musicologists
21st-century American male writers
21st-century American non-fiction writers
American male non-fiction writers